Mashi (also Romanized as Māshī) is a village in Kambel-e Soleyman Rural District, in the Central District of Chabahar County, Sistan and Baluchestan Province, Iran. At the 2006 census, its population was 118, in 26 families.

References 

Populated places in Chabahar County